North Korea competed as the Democratic People's Republic of Korea at the 1992 Winter Olympics in Albertville, France.

Medalists

Competitors
The following is the list of number of competitors in the Games.

Alpine skiing

Men

Women

Cross-country skiing

Men

1 Starting delay based on 10 km results. 
C = Classical style, F = Freestyle

Women

2 Starting delay based on 5 km results. 
C = Classical style, F = Freestyle

Figure skating

Men

Women

Pairs

Ice Dancing

Short track speed skating

Men

Women

Speed skating

Men

Women

References

Official Olympic Reports
International Olympic Committee results database
 Olympic Winter Games 1992, full results by sports-reference.com

Korea, North
1992
1992 in North Korean sport